Kamesh Nirmal (born 14 February 2000) is a Sri Lankan cricketer. He made his List A debut on 15 December 2019, for Tamil Union Cricket and Athletic Club in the 2019–20 Invitation Limited Over Tournament. He made his Twenty20 debut on 4 January 2020, for Tamil Union Cricket and Athletic Club in the 2019–20 SLC Twenty20 Tournament. He made his first-class debut on 31 January 2020, for Tamil Union Cricket and Athletic Club in the 2019–20 Premier League Tournament.

References

External links
 

2000 births
Living people
Sri Lankan cricketers
Tamil Union Cricket and Athletic Club cricketers
Place of birth missing (living people)